The 2012–13 season is Hull City's third consecutive season back in the Championship after relegation from the Premier League in the 2009–10 season. They also competed in the League Cup and the FA Cup.

After a dramatic last day of the season the club took second place and gained automatic promotion back to the Premier League for the 2013–14 season.

Events
The closed season saw the arrival of new manager Steve Bruce, on 8 June 2012, on a three-year deal, replacing Nick Barmby, 6 weeks after he was officially sacked.
On 29 June 2012 the club announced the new backroom staff for the up-and-coming season; Steve Agnew became the assistant manager, Keith Bertschin as first team coach and Stephen Clemence as reserve team manager. The announcement preceded the start of the new season which started on 2 July 2012 when the players reported back for pre-season training.

On 6 July 2012 Andy Dawson signed a new 1-year deal with the club. On 9 July 2012, goalkeeper Eldin Jakupović signed a two-year contract, becoming Steve Bruce's first full signing as manager.

On 19 July 2012 Nick Proschwitz signed a 3-year £2.6 million (€3.3 million) deal with the club. The following day Senegalese defender Abdoulaye Faye signed a one-year contract.

On 25 July 2012 Sone Aluko signed a 2-year deal with the club.

On 30 July 2012 Steve Bruce brought in his son Alex Bruce on a 2-year deal as he was a free agent after leaving Leeds United.

On 31 July 2012 Hull confirmed that they had signed goalkeeper Ben Amos on a season-long loan from Manchester United. The loan was cut short on 4 January 2013 when he was recalled by Manchester United.

On 8 August 2012 Mark Cullen went on a season long loan to Bury.

Robert Koren signed a new 2-year deal with the club on 11 August 2012.

On 29 August 2012 Danny East went out on a month-long loan to Northampton Town. The loan was later extended to 5 January 2013.

On 30 August 2012 Ahmed Elmohamady arrived on a season-long loan from Sunderland. The loan was cut short on 16 January 2013 when he was recalled by parent club Sunderland. But he returned to Hull on loan for the rest on the season on 31 January 2013.

On 31 August 2012 Cameron Stewart moved to Burnley on loan until January 2013.

On transfer deadline day, 31 August 2012, Stephen Quinn of Sheffield United signed a three-year deal with the club for an undisclosed fee.

In September 2012, former club manager Stan Ternent was appointed as Chief Recruitment Officer for Hull.

On 18 October 2012 Mark Cullen was recalled from a season long loan to Bury.

On 1 November 2012 Liam Cooper went on a month-long loan to Chesterfield and Jamie Devitt went on a month-long loan to  Rotherham United. Though after just two matches Devitt returned to the club for treatment following an injury. Cooper's loan was later extended to 5 January 2013.

On 26 October 2012 Mark Oxley went out on loan to Burton Albion to cover for an injury to Stuart Tomlinson.

On 5 November 2012 Robbie Brady returned to the KC Stadium on loan from Manchester United as an emergency loan, this was extended to 2 January 2012 on 5 December 2012.

On 8 November 2012 David Meyler was brought in on loan from Sunderland until 1 January 2013.

On 20 November 2012 Conor Townsend went for a month-long loan spell at Chesterfield, his loan spell was renewed on 25 January 2013 and extended to the end of the season.

On 22 November 2012 goalkeeper David Stockdale was brought in on loan from Fulham until 2 January 2013. This was cut short on 19 December 2012 when he was recalled by Fulham. Stockdale returned to Hull on 18 January 2013 for the remainder of the season.

Sone Aluko was named as the November Player of the Month by the Football League.

On 18 December 2012 it was announced that Nick Thompson had been appointed as managing director of the club.

Steve Bruce was named as the December Manager of the Month by the Football League.

On 4 January 2013 Jamie Devitt went out on loan to Grimsby Town until the end of the 2012–13 season and Aaron McLean moved on loan to Ipswich Town until the end of the 2012–13 season.

On 5 January 2013 Liam Cooper signed a permanent deal with Chesterfield for an undisclosed fee.

On 8 January 2013 the club signed Robbie Brady from Manchester United and David Meyler from Sunderland on three and a half-year deals for undisclosed fees.

On 25 January 2013 Paul McKenna was loaned to Fleetwood Town for the remainder of the season.

On 31 January 2013 Mark Cullen went out on a month-long loan spell to Stockport County. This was later extended to the end of the season.

On 31 January 2013 Ahmed Fathy and Gedo joined on loan for the remainder of the season from Egyptian club Al-Ahly at a cost of £500,000 each.

On 21 February 2013 George Boyd joined on loan from Peterborough United for the remainder of the season.

On 1 March 2013 Cameron Stewart joined Blackburn Rovers on loan until the end of the 2012–13 season.

On 7 March 2013 Danny East joined Gillingham on loan until the end of the 2012–13 season.

On 8 March 2013 Dougie Wilson joined Grimsby Town on loan until the end of the 2012–13 season.

On 27 March 2013 Seyi Olofinjana joined Sheffield Wednesday on loan until the end of the 2012–13 season.

On 28 March 2013 striker Calaum Jahraldo-Martin was signed on an 18-month contract.

George Boyd was named as the March Player of the Month by the Football League.

On 16 May 2013 Abdoulaye Faye signed a new one-year deal to stay with the club for the 2013–14 season, while 12 other players would be released at the end of their contracts.

George Boyd signed a 2-year deal on 28 May 2013 to become a permanent member of the club from the start of the 2013–14 season when his contract with Peterborough United expired.

Following release by the club Andy Dawson signed a one-year player/coach deal with Scunthorpe United on 30 May 2013.

Mark Oxley signed a new two-year contract with the Tigers on 11 June 2013 following the club's promotion to the Premier League.

On 17 June 2013 the signing of defender Maynor Figueroa on a 2-year contract on a free transfer was announced.

On 25 June 2013 Birmingham City defender Curtis Davies signed a 3-year deal with the club for an undisclosed fee.

On 26 June 2013 James Chester signed a new three-year contract with Hull City.

On 27 June 2013 Liam Rosenior signed a new two-year contract with the club.

After being on loan from Sunderland for the season on 28 June 2013 Ahmed Elmohamady signed a three-year contract for an undisclosed fee to become a permanent member of the City squad.

Players

Current squad

Out on loan

Results

Pre-season
The pre-season matches were announced on 20 June 2012. An additional home fixture against Norwich City was announced on 6 June 2012.
A pre-season training camp took place in Portugal from 8 July 2012.

Championship

Championship League table

Result round by round

League Cup

Hull City received a home match against local League Two side Rotherham United in the first round of the League Cup drawn on 14 June 2012. Following agreement between the clubs the date of the fixture was brought forward to Saturday 11 August 2012 and was the first competitive match of the 2012–13 season.
Hull progressed to the next round winning 7–6 after a penalty shoot-out following a 1–1 draw at full-time and no further scoring during extra time. In the draw for the second round on 15 August 2012 Hull were given another local match away to League One side Doncaster Rovers. The match took place on 28 August 2012 at the Keepmoat Stadium and Doncaster won 3–2 after Hull had taken a two-goal lead. The game was marred by a tackle on Tom Cairney that would result in him missing three-months of the season and the sending off of Paul McKenna who had come on as a substitute for Cairney.

FA Cup

Hull City enter the competition at the Third Round Proper stage with matches taking place in early January 2013. The draw for this took place at Wembley Stadium on 2 December 2012. Hull were drawn at home to either Alfreton Town or Leyton Orient. Later the same day Leyton Orient beat Alfreton Town 4–2 to set the League One team up with an away tie at the KC Stadium.
The game took place on 5 January 2013 and resulted in a 1–1 draw with a replay to take place at Brisbane Road on 15 January 2013. The draw for the fourth round took place the following day and the winner of the replay was drawn at home to Barnsley. The replay finished in a 1–1 draw after full-time, with Hull getting a late goal in extra time to put them through to the fourth round. The fourth round match took place on 26 January 2013 at the KC Stadium and Barnsley ran out winners by a single Chris Dagnall goal.

Statistics

Captains

Appearances

|}

Note: Appearances shown after a "+" indicate player came on during course of match.

Disciplinary record

Top scorers

Transfers
This section only lists transfers and loans for the 2012–13 season, which began 1 July 2012. For transactions in May and June 2012, see transfers and loans for the 2011–12 season.

Players in

Players out

Loans in

Loans out

Kits

The new home kit was revealed on 14 June 2012 on the Hull City web site. The away kit was revealed on 15 August 2012 on the Hull City web site.

For the 2012–13 season, the main kit sponsor is Cash Converters and it is manufactured by Adidas.

Awards
The end of season awards were made at the KC Stadium on 20 April 2013.
Ahmed Elmohamady was voted as the Player of the Season and Stephen Quinn took the prize for Players Player of the Year. The prize for the Goal of the Season was taken by
Nick Proschwitz for his goal against Leyton Orient on 15 January 2013 in the FA Cup third round replay. Dougie Wilson was awarded the Young Player of the Year Award while Andy Dawson was given a Special Contribution Award for his testimonial year with the club.

Notes

References

Hull City A.F.C. seasons
Hull City
2010s in Kingston upon Hull